Aceraceae were recognized as a family of flowering plants also called the maple family.  They contain two to four genera, depending upon the circumscription, of some 120 species of trees and shrubs. A common characteristic is that the leaves are opposite, and the fruit a schizocarp.

The maples have long been known to be closely related to the family Sapindaceae. Several taxonomists (including the Angiosperm Phylogeny Group) now include both the Aceraceae and the Hippocastanaceae in the Sapindaceae. Recent research (Harrington et al. 2005) has shown that while both Aceraceae and Hippocastanaceae are monophyletic in themselves, their removal from Sapindaceae sensu lato would leave Sapindaceae sensu stricto as a paraphyletic group, particularly with reference to the genus Xanthoceras.

Gallery

References

Sapindaceae
Historically recognized angiosperm families